Jin-hee is a Korean unisex given name, predominantly feminine. Its meaning depends on the hanja used to write each syllable of the name. There are 48 hanja with the reading "jin" and 24 hanja with the reading "hee" on the South Korean government's official list of hanja which may be registered for use in given names.

People with this name include:
Jeon Jin-hui, stage name Kang Hyo-shil (1932–1996), South Korean actress
Han Jin-hee (born 1949), South Korean actor
Kim Jin-hi (born 1957), South Korean female traditional musician
Ji Jin-hee (born 1971), South Korean actor
Park Jin-hee (born 1978), South Korean actress
Kim Jin-hee (footballer) (born 1981), South Korean female footballer
Kim Jin-hee (tennis) (born 1981), South Korean female tennis player
Lee Jin-hee (bobsledder) (born 1984), South Korean female  bobsledder
Yoon Jin-hee (born 1986), South Korean female weightlifter
Baek Jin-hee (born 1990), South Korean actress

See also
List of Korean given names

References

Korean unisex given names